John Gallatin Taff (June 3, 1890 – May 15, 1961), was a Major League Baseball pitcher who played in  with the Philadelphia Athletics. He batted and threw right-handed. Taff had a 0-1 record with a 6.62 ERA in seven games during his one-year career. He was born in Austin, Texas and died in Houston, Texas.

References

External links

1890 births
1961 deaths
Major League Baseball pitchers
Baseball players from Texas
Philadelphia Athletics players
Brownsville Brownies players
Waco Navigators players
Baltimore Orioles (IL) players
Beaumont Oilers players